Dryopteris erythrosora, the autumn fern or Japanese shield fern, is a species of fern in the family Dryopteridaceae, native to east Asia from China and Japan south to the Philippines, growing in light woodland shade on low mountains or hills.

Etymology
The specific epithet erythrosora comes from ancient Greek, meaning "having red spore cases".

Description

The fronds have a coppery tint when young, but mature to dark green. It has an upright to down-lying rhizome which is thick and branched, so that it forms several crowns.

The leaves are funnel-shaped with the top ones being leathery shiny, divided twice, triangular in shape and pointy. The individual leaflets are narrow lanceolate. Its edge is almost completely sown up.

The leaf stalks are about a third as long as the leaf, striated, yellow to red, with linear to lancet-shaped brown scales, containing two large and several small vascular bundles in a cross-sectional drawing.

When budding, the young fronds are coppery red and later green. There can also be several leaf outlets per year. The spores, which are kidney-shaped, become ripe between summer and autumn.

Cultivation
Dryopteris erythrosora can tolerate a drier soil than many ferns, but is most successful in moist, humus-rich soil, with a pH range of 6.1 to 7.5, with morning or late afternoon sunshine but not during the middle of the day. It is hardy zones 5 to 11. Propagation is by division in spring, separating the small crowns from the larger crowns, or by spores. It is raised as an ornamental plant in gardens because of its color change in the foliage, which change from dark red to dark green, but not very often.

Dryopteris erythrosora and the cultivar D. erythrosora 'Brilliance' have gained the Royal Horticultural Society's Award of Garden Merit.

References

erythrosora
Ferns of Asia
Flora of Eastern Asia
Flora of China
Flora of the Philippines
Garden plants of Asia